Maxime Loïc Feudjou Nguegang (born 14 April 1992) is a Cameroonian international footballer who plays as a goalkeeper for Union Douala.

Club career
Feudjou was born in Douala. He made his senior debuts for third division Botafogo FC in 2010, joining local giants Coton Sport FC in December 2011. Feudjou was initially signed as a third-choice, behind Kassaly Daouda and Jean Efala; however, he was selected as a starter during the first matches of the season, and finished the season as first-choice. In September, he was linked to English Premier League side Reading, but nothing came of it.

In 2013, Feudjou played a key part for Coton Sport, helping the club to reach the semi-finals of CAF Champions League and also being a part of the squad which was crowned champions of the Elite One and the Cameroon Cup.

On 26 December 2019, Feudjou returned to Cameroon and joined Union Douala.

Honours
 With  Coton Sport
Cameroon Premiere Division
Champion  (2) 2013,
2014
Cameroon Cup
Winner  (1) 2014
 With  Al-Hilal Club
Sudan Premier League
Champion  (2) 2016, 2017
Sudan Cup
Winner (1) 2016

International career
On 23 February 2012 Feudjou was called up to Cameroon's main squad for a 2013 Africa Cup of Nations qualification match against Guinea-Bissau. He made his debut on 29 May 2014, replacing Charles Itandje in a 1–2 loss against Paraguay.

On 7 June, Feudjou was handed his first start, playing the entire first half in a 1–0 success against Moldova.

References

External links

1992 births
Footballers from Douala
Living people
Cameroonian footballers
Cameroon international footballers
Association football goalkeepers
Coton Sport FC de Garoua players
Al-Hilal Club (Omdurman) players
Al-Orobah FC players
Union Douala players
2014 FIFA World Cup players
Saudi First Division League players
Expatriate footballers in Sudan
Cameroonian expatriate sportspeople in Sudan
Expatriate footballers in Saudi Arabia
Cameroonian expatriate sportspeople in Saudi Arabia